Montefino is a small town and predominantly rural comune of the province of Teramo in the Abruzzo region of eastern Italy. During the second half of the twentieth century the population of the comune declined steadily from 2,399 in 1951 to 1,184—less than half—in 2001.

The town is situated on a hill of some  overlooking the Fino valley where olives and grain are the major crops. Until the 19th century Montefino was called Montesecco meaning "dry mountain" and referring to a site lacking in springs. In 1863, however, it adopted its current name which refers to the river Fino.

History
The area around Montefino belonged in antiquity to the territory of the Adriatic Sabini, and later to that of the  Roman colonia Hatria Picena, modern Atri. Little is known, however, of any settlement here until around 1150, with the mention of a castellum Montis Sicci with around 65 inhabitants belonging to the County of Penne.

In 1454 Mons Siccus become a fief of the Acquaviva of Atri who restored the defensive walls of the town and constructed a new castle. By 1506 the town had come into the possession of the bishops of Teramo.

Economy
A majority of the population works in industry. It is a traditionally agricultural area, but work dedicated to the breeding of animals and agriculture is in decline.

Main sights
The old fortress, or Castello di Corte, whose Norman form and features are still recognizable, occupies the highest part of the town. On the terraces below this developed the later medieval town, with a second castle, the Castello degli Acquaviva, and an eighteenth-century church dedicated to Saint James the Great, the Chiesa di San Giacomo Apostolo, whose fabric includes an external portal of the sixteenth century recovered from an abandoned abbey nearby.

Events
The Feast of Saint James is celebrated on 25 July. Also in July is the annual olive oil festival, or Sagra dell'olio.

Sources
Basic data on population, mayor, location, elevation, etc.:
 The corresponding article on the Italian Wikipedia 
 http://www.comuni-italiani.it/067/027 , and linked pages
 https://web.archive.org/web/20061028074157/http://abruzzo2000.com/genealogy/archives/te_comunifrazioni.htm 
 http://www.paesionline.it/abruzzo/montefino/comune_montefino.asp  (patron saint)

History and monuments:
 Itinerari di conoscenza tra opere e natura nelle Montagne Teramane  Documentation centre for the mountains of the Province of Teramo

General:
 www.montefino.org  a website devoted to the village
  Tourist information office
 http://www.abruzzocitta.it/comuni/montefino.html 

Cities and towns in Abruzzo